RoboCop is a 1988 superhero animated series based on the 1987 movie RoboCop. The cartoon aired as part of the Marvel Action Universe programming block. The series was animated by AKOM Productions.

The show made a number of changes to the RoboCop universe to make it more appropriate for younger viewers, including replacing bullets with laser weapons and shifting the series to a more science fiction setting. In this series, RoboCop had a red light in the middle of his visor (which occasionally panned the whole visor). It is set in an alternate continuity where events similar to those shown in the movie happened, excluding Clarence Boddicker's death, who shows up in the last episode.

Ownership of the series passed to Disney in 2001 when Disney acquired Fox Kids Worldwide, which also includes Marvel Productions, while Amazon's Metro-Goldwyn-Mayer (under Orion Pictures label) remains as current rights holder of the RoboCop franchise. But the series is not available on Disney+.

Plot 
Based on the original movie, the series features cyborg cop Alex Murphy (RoboCop), who fights to save the city of Old Detroit from assorted rogue elements, and on occasion, fighting to reclaim aspects of his humanity and maintain his usefulness in the eyes of the "Old Man", Chairman of Omni Consumer Products. Many episodes see RoboCop's reputation put to the test or soured by interventions from Dr. McNamara, the creator of ED-260, the upgradable version of the Enforcement Droid Series 209 and the top competitor for the financial backing of OCP. He continually develops other mechanical menaces that threaten RoboCop.

In the police force, RoboCop is befriended by Officer Anne Lewis, who is depicted to have romantic inclinations towards him, but is also picked on and lambasted by the prejudiced Lieutenant Roger Hedgecock (who appeared as a minor character in the original film), who is determined to be rid of him and his kind, who he sees as ticking time bomb. Their rivalry comes to a fever pitch during the episode "The Man in the Iron Suit", in which Hedgecock comes close to finally beating Murphy with the aid of a new weapons system developed by McNamara. He almost kills Lewis when she interferes, enraging Murphy into tearing Hedgecock's iron suit apart and nearly crushing his skull before Lewis comes to his aid. RoboCop is maintained by RoboCop Project director Dr. Tyler.

The title sequence features a brief animated variation on Murphy being gunned down by Clarence Boddicker and his gang. Throughout the series, RoboCop struggles to deal with the pain of losing his humanity. Other themes include racism ("The Brotherhood"), prejudice at work ("Man in the Iron Suit"), environmental espionage ("Into the Wilderness"), terrorism, and the Middle East peace process ("A Robot's Revenge").

While this series is based on the original film, there are significant changes to RoboCop and his environment. RoboCop is faster and has a greater range of movement than in the films. The Old Detroit of the series is also considerably more technologically advanced: lasers replace handguns and robots are commonplace, Dr. Tyler (who appears in the original film) is the creator of the RoboCop Program, not Bob Morton, and also serves as one of Murphy's confidants as well as his caregiver, along with Dr. Roosevelt. Clarence Boddicker, the man responsible for Alex's Murphy's death prior to him becoming RoboCop, despite dying in the film, is shown to still be alive and battles RoboCop again in "Menace of the Mind", indicating the series takes place in an alternate continuity.

Cast 
 Robert Bockstael - RoboCop/Alex J. Murphy, Dr. McNamara
 Susan Roman - Anne Lewis
 Harvey Atkin - K.R.U.D. station manager
 Barbara Budd - Dr. Tyler
 Len Carlson - The Old Man, Clarence Boddicker, Casey Wong, The Scrambler, Ace Jackson, Intro Narrator
 Allen Stewart-Coates - ED-260
 Rex Hagon - Lt. Roger Hedgecock
 Dan Hennessey - Edwards
 Ron James - Wheels Wilson
 Gordon Masten - Birdman Barnes, Joe Cox
 Greg Morton - Sgt. Reed, Dr. Roosevelt
 Chris Ward - Cecil, Ralph

Crew 
 Stu Rosen - Voice Director

Episode guide 

The reason why there were only 12 episodes instead of the traditional 13 for a weekly animated series is because Marvel Productions used the budget for what would've been the 13th episode of RoboCop to fund a pilot for a proposed X-Men animated series.

Home media 
In 1991, three episodes of the series were released as individual NTSC VHS volumes, distributed by Best Film & Video Corp. under the Marvel Video! banner. The episodes were: "Man in the Iron Suit!" (volume 1), "Crime Wave" (volume 2), and "A Robot's Revenge" (volume 3).

On February 18, 2008, UK distributor Maximum Entertainment released the complete series in a three-disc box set containing all 12 episodes.

DVD release

United Kingdom 
In the 2000s, Maximum Entertainment (Under license from Jetix Europe) released several DVDs of RoboCop on Region 2 DVD in the UK.

References

External links 
 

1980s American animated television series
1980s American science fiction television series
1988 American television series debuts
1988 American television series endings
1988 Canadian television series debuts
1988 Canadian television series endings
1980s Canadian animated television series
1980s Canadian science fiction television series
American children's animated action television series
American children's animated adventure television series
American children's animated science fiction television series
American children's animated superhero television series
Animated television series about robots
Animated television shows based on films
Canadian children's animated action television series
Canadian children's animated adventure television series
Canadian children's animated science fiction television series
First-run syndicated television programs in the United States
Cyborgs in television 
Animated Series, The
Television series by Disney–ABC Domestic Television
Television series by Marvel Productions
Television series by Saban Entertainment